Viverridae is a family of mammals in the order Carnivora, composed mainly of the civets and genets. A member of this family is called a viverrid. They are widespread primarily throughout Africa, India, and southeast Asia, and are found primarily in forests, shrublands, and grasslands, though some species can be found in savannas or wetlands. Most viverrids are 40–65 cm (16–26 in) long, plus a 35–60 cm (14–24 in) tail, though the West African oyan can be as small as 30 cm (12 in) plus a 35 cm (14 in) tail, and some binturongs can be up to 96 cm (38 in) plus a 89 cm (35 in) tail. Most species do not have population estimates, though three viverrids are classified as endangered, and one, the Malabar large-spotted civet, is classified as critically endangered with a population size of around 200. No viverrid species have been domesticated.

The 33 species of Viverridae are split into 14 genera within 4 subfamilies: the 3 civet subfamilies Viverrinae, Hemigalinae, and Paradoxurinae, and the genet subfamily Genettinae. A fifth subfamily, Prionodontinae, was previously included in Viverridae, while the species in Genettinae were considered part of Viverrinae, but more recent genetic evidence resulted in the consensus to separate Prionodontinae into its own family and split out Genettinae into its own subfamily. Extinct species have also been placed into Viverrinae, as well as the extinct subfamily Lophocyoninae, though most extinct species have not been categorized into a subfamily. Nearly twenty extinct Viverridae species have been discovered, though due to ongoing research and discoveries the exact number and categorization is not fixed.

Conventions

Conservation status codes listed follow the International Union for Conservation of Nature (IUCN) Red List of Threatened Species. Range maps are provided wherever possible; if a range map is not available, a description of the viverrid's range is provided. Ranges are based on the IUCN Red List for that species unless otherwise noted.

Classification
The family Viverridae consists of 33 extant species belonging to 14 genera in 4 subfamilies and divided into dozens of extant subspecies. This does not include hybrid species or extinct prehistoric species.

 Subfamily Genettinae
 Genus Genetta: fourteen species
 Genus Poiana: two species
 Subfamily Hemigalinae
 Genus Chrotogale: one species
 Genus Cynogale: one species
 Genus Diplogale: one species
 Genus Hemigalus: one species
 Subfamily Paradoxurinae
 Genus Arctictis: one species
 Genus Arctogalidia: one species
 Genus Macrogalidia: one species
 Genus Paguma: one species
 Genus Paradoxurus: three species
 Subfamily Viverrinae
 Genus Civettictis: one species
 Genus Viverra: four species
 Genus Viverricula: one species

Viverrids
The following classification is based on the taxonomy described by Mammal Species of the World (2005), with augmentation by generally accepted proposals made since using molecular phylogenetic analysis. This includes the promotion of the Prionodontinae subfamily into its own family, and the moving of the Poiana and Genetta genera out of the Viverrinae subfamily into their own Genettinae subfamily. There are several additional proposals which are disputed, such as splitting the golden palm civet into three species or adding three additional species to Genetta, which are not included here.

Subfamily Genettinae

Subfamily Hemigalinae

Subfamily Paradoxurinae

Subfamily Viverrinae

Prehistoric viverrids

In addition to extant viverrids, a number of prehistoric species have been discovered and classified as a part of Viverridae. In addition to being placed within the extant subfamily Viverrinae, they have been categorized within the extinct subfamily Lophocyoninae, though most have not been classified within a subfamily. There is no generally accepted classification of extinct viverrid species. The species listed here are based on data from the Paleobiology Database, unless otherwise cited. Where available, the approximate time period the species was extant is given in millions of years before the present (Mya), also based on data from the Paleobiology Database. All listed species are extinct; where a genus or subfamily within Viverridae comprises only extinct species, it is indicated with a dagger symbol .

 Subfamily Lophocyoninae
 Genus Lophocyon
 L. paraskevaidisi

 Subfamily Viverrinae (24 Mya–present)
 Genus Orangictis (24–11 Mya)
 O. gariepensis (24–11 Mya)
 Genus Semigenetta (17–15 Mya)
 S. cadeoti (17–15 Mya)
 Genus Viverra (7.3 Mya–present)
 V. leakeyi (Leakey's civet) (7.3–2.5 Mya)

 Unclassified
 Genus Africanictis (24–11 Mya)
 A. hyaenoides (24–11 Mya)
 A. meini (24–11 Mya)
 A. schmidtkittleri (24–15 Mya)
 Genus Kanuites
 K. lewisae
 Genus Ketketictis (24–15 Mya)
 K. solida (24–15 Mya)
 Genus Leptoplesictis (24–15 Mya)
 L. senutae (24–15 Mya)
 L. namibiensis (24–15 Mya)
 Genus Mioprionodon (29–23 Mya)
 M. hodopeus (29–23 Mya)
 Genus Progenetta (16–7.2 Mya)
 Genus Pseudocivetta (5.4–1.8 Mya)
 Genus Sahelictis
 Genus Tugenicitis
 Genus Vishnuictis (5.4–2.5 Mya)

References

 
viverridae
viverridae